Stotfold Football Club is a football club based at Stotfold, Bedfordshire, England. The club is affiliated to the Bedfordshire County Football Association.

History
The first recorded football in Stotfold occurred in 1904 although it is certain the game was played in the town for a number of years before that. In the early 1900s, Stotfold sides played in the Biggleswade and District League. This was followed by a spell of nearly 30 years in North Herts football. The first record of a trophy being won was 1911 when Potton were beaten 1–0 in the Biggleswade and District Championship.

Stotfold FC was officially founded, with proper financing, stewardship and record-keeping, in 1946. The club played for many years at the Hitchin Road Recreation Ground before moving into the newly-developed Roker Park ground in 1965. This ground was just a meadow named "Roker" when it was first used by Stotfold Athletic in 1911. 

In 1951 the club joined the South Midlands League Division Two, finishing 2nd to gain immediate promotion to Division One. They were Division One champions in 1953–54 and were promoted to the Premier Division, where they remained for thirty years. Stotfold won the South Midlands League Premier Division for the first time in the 1980–81 season under the management team of Brian Parker, Peter Godden, and Geoff Heard. They were also runners-up seven times.

In 1984, the Eagles were transferred to the United Counties League. They were admitted straight into the Premier Division, where they stayed until 2010. Through the 1990s, the club generally finished high in the top ten. After several changes of manager, the club re-appointed former Arsenal man Ian Allinson as manager for 2007–08, and he rewarded them by leading the club to their most successful season, including the UCL championship for the first time. He subsequently left to join Boreham Wood. The championship was clinched in dramatic fashion; starting the second half 0–4 down to closest challengers Long Buckby, Stotfold managed to equalise in the 90th minute for the point needed to clinch the title.

Stotfold transferred to the Spartan South Midlands League for the 2010–11 season. They remained in the Premier Division before being relegated to Division One on the last day of the 2018–19 campaign.

Stotfold achieved a landmark for the club in February 2020 when they moved to their brand new £2m step 4 ready stadium at New Roker Park on Arlesey Road.

Former players
1. Players that have played/managed in the football league or any foreign equivalent to this level (i.e. fully professional league).
2. Players with full international caps.
3. Players that hold a club record or have captained the club.
Mitchell Cole – (2011)
Josh Coley – (2020)
Darren Dykes – (2005–06)
Graeme Tomlinson – (2003–04)
Ian Allinson – (2005–08)
Phil Gray – (2005)
Liam George – (2005)

Management Team
Manager – Brett Donnelly
Assistant manager – Eddie McLoughlin
Assistant manager – Paul Donnelly
Goalkeeper coach – Michael Parkin
Physio – Ryan Jefferies
Development Team & U18s Manager – Jon Little
Development Team Assistant Manager – Sean Lyness
Kit Man – Roy Ryall

Honours
United Counties League Premier Division
Champions 2007–08
Runners-up 1993–94, 1995–96, 2008–09
South Midlands League Premier Division
Champions 1980–81
Runners-up 1955–56, 1957–58, 1958–59, 1959–60, 1963–64, 1965–66, 1977–78
South Midlands League Division 1
Champions 1953-54
Spartan South Midlands League Division 1
Champions 2021–22
South Midlands League Division 2
Runners-up 1951-52
United Counties League Knock-Out Cup
Winners 1999, 2000
South Midlands League Challenge Trophy
Winners 1982
Spartan South Midlands League Challenge Trophy
Runners-up 2014, 2022
Spartan South Midlands League Senior Floodlight Cup
Runners-up 2014
Spartan South Midlands League Division 1 Cup
Runners-up 2022
 Bedfordshire County Football Association Senior Cup
Winners 1965, 1994, 2000, 2008 
Runners-up 2001
 Bedfordshire County Football Association Premier Cup 
Winners 1982, 1992, 1999
 Bedfordshire County Football Association Intermediate Cup
Winners 1959, 1992, 1998, 2002
Runners-up 2009
 Bedfordshire County Football Association Senior Trophy 
Winners 2020, 2022
Biggleswade Knock-Out Cup
Winners 1998, 2000, 2007, 2008, 2009, 2013
Runners-up 2010 
North Bedfordshire Charity Cup
Winners 1956, 1957, 1962, 1982, 1988, 1991, 1998, 2003, 2010
Southern Combination Cup
Winners 1995, 1996
Hinchingbrooke Cup
Winners 2000
Runners-up 2014

Records
FA Cup
Third Qualifying Round 2007–08
FA Vase
Fourth Round 1994–95, 1997–98, 2000–01, 2009–10

References

External links
Stotfold official website

United Counties League
Association football clubs established in 1904
1904 establishments in England
Football clubs in Bedfordshire
Football clubs in England
Stotfold